Hishammuddin bin Hussein (Jawi: هشام الدين بن حسين; born 5 August 1961) is a Malaysian politician and lawyer who served as Senior Minister of the Security Cluster and Minister of Defence from 2021 to 2022. A member of the United Malays National Organisation (UMNO), a component party of the Barisan Nasional (BN) coalition, he has been a Member of Parliament (MP) for Sembrong since 2004, having previously been an MP for Tenggara from 1995 to 2004.

Hishammuddin was born in Johor Bahru to Hussein Onn and Suhailah Noah. His father was the third prime minister of Malaysia. He attended Malay College Kuala Kangsar, St. John's Institution, Alice Smith School, and Cheltenham College. He then graduated with a Bachelor of Laws from Aberystwyth University and a Master of Laws from the London School of Economics before working as a lawyer. After making partner at Scrine, he started his own firm, Lee Hishammuddin, which later merged with Allen and Gledhill to form Lee Hishammuddin Allen and Gledhill. 

On his return from UK, Hishammuddin joined UMNO. He was first elected to Dewan Rakyat in the 1995 election, winning the seat of Tenggara. He was later appointed deputy minister and was promoted to full minister in 1999. In 1999, he was elected as UMNO's youth chief, and subsequently as its vice president in 2009. Since then, he has held various ministerial positions until the defeat of BN in the 2018 election. Despite the defeat, he managed to retain his Sembrong seat.

At the beginning of the political crisis that started in 2020, Hishammuddin returned to the cabinet as Minister of Foreign Affairs under Perikatan Nasional (PN) coalition led by Muhyiddin Yassin. Amid the worsening political crisis in July 2021, Muhyiddin appointed Hishammuddin as Senior Minister of Security Cluster to replace Ismail Sabri Yaakob, who was appointed as Deputy Prime Minister. He briefly served in the office until August 2021, after Muhyiddin announced his resignation. Two weeks after that, Hishammuddin returned again to the cabinet under new Prime Minister Ismail Sabri, who re-appointed him as senior minister. He was also appointed as the Minister of Defence, an office he had held previously from 2013 to 2018.

Early life and education 
Hishammuddin was born on 5 August 1961, the fourth child and the eldest son of Hussein Onn, who became the third Prime Minister of Malaysia, and Suhaila Noah. He is the grandson of Onn Jaafar, a prominent Malay leader and the founder of UMNO, whose mother was a Circassian and born in the Ottoman Empire.

Hishammuddin attended the Malay College Kuala Kangsar before his father became Deputy Prime Minister in 1973. Upon his father's appointment to the office, he attended St. John's Institution, and then the Alice Smith School, in Kuala Lumpur, before attending the English public school Cheltenham College in Gloucestershire.

Hishammuddin graduated with a Bachelor of Laws (LLB) degree from the University of Wales, Aberystwyth, in 1984. He also attended the London School of Economics and received a Master of Laws (LLM) degree in Commercial and Corporate Law in 1988.

Early career 
After completing his studies in UK, Hishammuddin returned to Malaysia in 1989. He joined UMNO and began his career as a lawyer. He became a partner of Skrine & Co (present day Skrine), the largest law firm in Malaysia. In 1993, he left Skrine & Co to set up his own law firm with Thomas Mun Lung Lee, and the established law firm was known as Lee Hishammuddin (present day Lee Hishammuddin Allen & Gledhill).

Political career 
Hishammuddin rose through the ranks of UMNO's youth wing in the 1990s, becoming its national chief in 1998. He assumed the position at a time when UMNO Youth had been torn apart by the sacking of Deputy Prime Minister Anwar Ibrahim, who was popular among young UMNO members. Hishammuddin's predecessor, Ahmad Zahid Hamidi, had been a core supporter of Anwar.

In 1995, Hishammuddin had been elected to the federal parliament for the Johor-based seat of Tenggara. He was immediately appointed as Parliamentary Secretary for International Trade and Industry in the government of Mahathir Mohamad. His rise to the leadership of UMNO Youth in 1998 coincided with his elevation to the full ministry the following year, as the Minister for Youth and Sport. He retained his parliamentary seat in the 1999 election.

In 2004, the Barisan Nasional government, now led by Abdullah Badawi, was returned to power with Hishammuddin holding the newly created seat of Sembrong. Hishammuddin was re-elected as the leader of UMNO Youth and appointed Minister for Education.

In 2009, the resignation of Abdullah Badawi as prime minister caused a shake-up in UMNO's senior leadership. Najib Razak, Hishammuddin's cousin, became UMNO's president and the prime minister, Muhyiddin Yassin became Najib's deputy in both the party and the government, and the three UMNO vice-presidencies were up for election. Hishammuddin, vacating the leadership of UMNO Youth, contested the vice-presidencies, finishing in second place in an eight-man field. His ascension to the party's vice-presidency in turn guaranteed him a senior Cabinet post, and he was appointed as Minister for Home Affairs.

After the 2013 election, in which Najib's government suffered further losses, especially among Chinese voters, Hishammuddin recontested the UMNO vice-presidency. He was barely re-elected in third place, finishing nine votes ahead of Mukhriz Mahathir. He switched ministries with Zahid, taking over the latter's portfolio of Defence. He also assumed the transport ministry on an acting basis; that ministry was normally reserved for the Malaysian Chinese Association, which had decided to withdraw from the Cabinet temporarily, having endured significant losses in the general election. As acting transport minister he was thrust into the international spotlight as the minister responsible for the investigation into the disappearance of Malaysia Airlines Flight 370. The Sydney Morning Herald criticised Hishammuddin in this position, arguing that he had "struggled during daily press briefings to defend his country’s handling of the search and investigation". Najib, however, defended Hishammuddin's performance. His role ceased in June 2014, when Liow Tiong Lai assumed the ministry. Hishammuddin retained his substantive post as defence minister.

In April 2017, Hishammuddin was appointed as Minister in the Prime Minister's Department for Special Functions. Prime Minister Najib Razak said that the appointment would enable Hishammuddin to carry out duties other than his responsibilities as Minister of Defence, he still however would remain as Minister for Defence. 

In March 2020, Hishammuddin was appointed as Minister of Foreign Affairs by newly-appointed Prime Minister Muhyiddin Yassin following the collapse of the previous Pakatan Harapan Government in February.

Controversies and issues

Keris Incident
In his second term as UMNO Youth's leader, Hishammuddin waded into controversy by brandishing the keris, a Malay sword's and symbol of Malay nationalism, at UMNO's 2005 annual general meeting. In response to concerns over the racial rhetoric, then Vice-President Tan Sri Muhyiddin Yassin said that "Although some sides were a bit extreme [this year], it is quite normal to voice feelings during the assembly." The racially provocative act was criticized by opposition politicians as well as some Chinese politicians from the Barisan Nasional coalition. In 2008, Hishammuddin conceded that the act had caused the coalition to lose support among non-Malay voters in that year's general election.

Vaping in Dewan Rakyat
On 6 August 2020, Hishammuddin apologised after being pinpointed by a netizen vaping during Parliament session.

Big brother controversy
On 2 April 2021, Hishammuddin’s two-day working visit to China was overshadowed by a diplomatic gaffe. Opposition Leader Anwar Ibrahim skewered Hishammuddin for calling China a "big brother" during his joint address with his Chinese counterpart Minister Wang Yi. Anwar also saying it may have set Malaysia's foreign policy back by 25 years.

On 3 April 2021, Hishammuddin defended using the term “Big Brother” to refer to his Wang Yi, saying it was a sign of respect. Former foreign minister Anifah Aman has told Hishammuddin to admit his error in making a "big brother" reference to China, instead of compounding the matter by disputing it.

51% Bumiputra Logistic Equity Control Policy	
On 27 September 2021, the cabinet of Malaysia has sparked criticism after Hishammuddin announced a new equity policy for Bumiputera companies under the five-year development plan, Twelfth Malaysia Plan (12MP), which was tabled by him in Parliament. The policy is said to ensure sustainable equity holdings by Bumiputeras, an equity safety net would be launched to guarantee that the sale of shares or Bumiputera firms would only be sold solely to Bumiputera companies, consortiums or individuals. Syed Saddiq mentioned that the new rulings were unfair as they would be tantamount to taking equity from the non-bumiputeras and giving them to bumiputeras. Former Health Minister, Dzulkefly Ahmad had also described the policy as "suicidal" and claimed that the new policy would only kill the Bumiputera companies economically if that is their intention. He also said that based on the feedback from Malay businessmen, most were against the idea of the new Bumiputera-only policy being implemented. Ismail Sabri announced it after revealing that the government’s target to raise Bumiputera equity ownership to 30% had yet to be achieved. He also announced fundings to improve Bumiputera businesses’ sustainability to hit 15% contribution in gross domestic product (GDP) by Bumiputera micro, small and medium enterprises by 2025.

Personal life
His wife, Tengku Marsilla Tengku Abdullah, is a princess from the state of Pahang. They married in 1986.  He was diagnosed with COVID-19 on 22nd February 2022.

Election results

Honours

Honours of Malaysia
  :
  Knight Commander of the Order of the Crown of Johor (DPMJ) – Dato' (1996)
  :
  Knight Companion of the Order of Sultan Ahmad Shah of Pahang (DSAP) – Dato' (1998)
  Grand Knight of the Order of the Crown of Pahang (SIMP) – formerly Dato', now Dato' Indera (2002)
  Grand Knight of the Order of Sultan Ahmad Shah of Pahang (SSAP) – Dato' Sri (2004)
  :
  Knight Grand Commander of the Order of the Crown of Perlis (SPMP) – Dato' Seri (2007)
  :
  Grand Commander of the Order of Kinabalu (SPDK) – Datuk Seri Panglima (2011)
  :
  Knight Commander of the Most Exalted Order of the Star of Sarawak (PNBS) – Dato Sri (2013)
  :
  Grand Commander of the Exalted Order of Malacca (DGSM) – Datuk Seri (2014)

Foreign honours
  :
 Medal of First Degree – (2017)

See also
Tenggara (federal constituency)
Sembrong (federal constituency)

Notes and references

External links 

1961 births
Living people
People from Johor
Malaysian Muslims
Malaysian people of Circassian descent
Malaysian people of Turkish descent
Malaysian people of Malay descent
Malaysian people of Bugis descent
20th-century Malaysian politicians
21st-century Malaysian politicians
20th-century Malaysian lawyers
21st-century Malaysian lawyers
United Malays National Organisation politicians
Members of the Dewan Rakyat
Government ministers of Malaysia
Defence ministers of Malaysia
Education ministers of Malaysia
Home ministers of Malaysia
Foreign ministers of Malaysia
Transport ministers of Malaysia
People educated at Cheltenham College
Alumni of Aberystwyth University
Alumni of the London School of Economics
Children of prime ministers of Malaysia
Knights Commander of the Order of the Crown of Johor
Knights Commander of the Most Exalted Order of the Star of Sarawak
Grand Commanders of the Order of Kinabalu